Matiashvili is a Georgian surname. Notable people with the surname include:
Giorgi Matiashvili (born 1977), Georgian major general 
Levani Matiashvili (born 1993), Georgian judoka
Manana Matiashvili (born 1978),  Georgian poet, translator and journalist
Soso Matiashvili (born 1993), Georgian rugby union player

Surnames of Georgian origin
Georgian-language surnames